Helen Marshall may refer to:

 Helen M. Marshall (1929–2017), American politician from New York
 Helen Marshall (historian) (1898–?), American historian of nursing
 Helen Marshall (artist) (born 1971), British visual artist
 Helen Marshall (medical researcher) (born 1961), Australian vaccinologist